The Rusenski Lom is a river in northeastern Bulgaria, the last major right tributary of the Danube. It is formed by the rivers Beli Lom and Cherni Lom, the former taking its source south of Razgrad and the latter southeast of Popovo.

Both rivers primarily run northwestwards, with the Beli Lom going west at Senovo and the Cherni Lom flowing northeast after Shirokovo, as the two rivers get closer to merge east of Ivanovo. The Rusenski Lom empties into the Danube at the city of Ruse, which gives the river its name.

The Rusenski Lom flows through Rusenski Lom Nature Park.

References

Rivers of Bulgaria
Landforms of Razgrad Province
Landforms of Ruse Province